STM Kargu is a small portable  rotary wing loitering munition produced in Turkey by STM
(Savunma Teknolojileri Mühendislik ve Ticaret A.Ş.) that has been designed for asymmetric warfare or counter-insurgency. It can be carried by a single personnel in both autonomous and manual modes. KARGU can be effectively used against static or moving targets through its real-time image processing capabilities and machine learning algorithms embedded on the platform. The system consists of the rotary wing attack drone and ground control unit.

In 2020 a STM Kargu loaded with explosives detected and attacked Haftar's forces in Libya with its artificial intelligence without command, according to a report from the United Nations Security Council's Panel of Experts on Libya, published in March 2021. It was considered the first drone attack in history carried out by the UAVs on their own initiative.

In Turkish, Kargu means “mountain observation tower” because these drones were initially designed as an airborne sentry or surveillance tool.

Capabilities
According to STM CEO Murat Ikinci, Kargu has a facial recognition system, suggesting it can seek out specific individuals. Its swarms are too numerous to be tackled by advanced air defense systems and can destroy a large number of targets very rapidly. The company's YouTube channel features a video of several Kargu 2 drones operating in formation, demonstrating the ability of Kargu 2 to operate in a drone swarm. The capability of this swarm to autonomously identify, select and coordinate attacks on a target has, however, never been demonstrated by STM in reality. 

Other capabilities includes:
 Day and night operations
 Autonomous and precise hit
 Different ammunition options
 Tracking moving targets
 Navigation and control algorithms
 Deployable and operable by single person
 In-flight mission abort and emergency self-destruction

Operational history
Kargu was used in Syria and Libya by the Turkish Armed Forces. It was also reportedly used by Azerbaijan during the 2020 Nagorno-Karabakh war, though it hasn't been verified by the Azerbaijani authorities yet.

In 2020 a Kargu 2 Drone hunted down and attacked a human target in Libya, according to a report from the UN Security Council’s Panel of Experts on Libya, published in March 2021. This may have been the first time an autonomous killer robot armed with lethal weaponry attacked human beings. The capability of Kargu 2 to attack targets autonomously has however never been demonstrated by the company. Commercials demonstrating Kargu 2's capabilities have shown a human operator selecting the targets and engaging the attack mode, while the drone is only responsible to perform the attack dive on the pre-selected target.

Operators 
 : minimum 27
 : 500 operational
 : Unknown quantity. Anti-personnel and anti-armour systems. Introduced with Diseños Casanave International company.

Possible buyers 
STM told that they were in discussion with three unnamed foreign countries about export sales of Kargu. STM mentioned "desert, tundra and tropical conditions" suggesting the buyers may be some distance from Turkey.

A UN panel says that Government of National Accord affiliated forces have likely received STM Kargu drones, specifically the Kargu-2 model.

Specifications 

Data from official STM website:
 Crew: 0 on board, 1 in ground station
 Length: 
 Wing Span: 
 Weight:

Performance 
 Maximum Speed: 
 Service Ceiling: 
 Operational altitude: 
 Endurance: 30 minutes
 Range:

Warhead
 Different ammunition options with ability to load ammunition prior to use

Avionics
 Camera with 10x optical zoom
 Artificial Intelligence Machine Learning algorithms
Target identification and tracking

References

External links
 KARGU Rotary Wing Attack Drone Loitering Munition System STM website.

International unmanned aerial vehicles
Quadcopters
Unmanned military aircraft of Turkey
Loitering munition
Unmanned aerial vehicles of Turkey
Military equipment introduced in the 2020s